Leonardo Fabio Moreno (born November 2, 1973) is a Colombian  former football forward.

Titles

References

1973 births
Living people
Colombian footballers
Colombia international footballers
Colombian expatriate footballers
Association football forwards
Categoría Primera A players
Liga MX players
Uruguayan Primera División players
América de Cali footballers
Club Atlético Belgrano footballers
Deportes Tolima footballers
Independiente Santa Fe footballers
Deportes Quindío footballers
Club América footballers
Atlético Celaya footballers
Chiapas F.C. footballers
San Lorenzo de Almagro footballers
Atlético Nacional footballers
Atlético Bucaramanga footballers
Deportivo Pasto footballers
Boyacá Chicó F.C. footballers
Peñarol players
Expatriate footballers in Mexico
Expatriate footballers in Argentina
Expatriate footballers in Uruguay
Footballers from Cali